John Taylor (1757–1832) was an English oculist, drama critic, editor and finally newspaper publisher, perhaps most famous for his posthumous memoir Records of My Life.

Biography
Taylor was educated by a Dr. Crawford in Hatton Garden before attending a school at Ponders End, Middlesex.

Grandson of the King's oculist, also named John Taylor, the younger Taylor was appointed oculist in his turn, along with his brother, during the reign of George III.  He later wrote drama criticism for The Morning Post, eventually becoming its editor.  His last career change was to publishing, when he bought the True Briton, and then The Sun, a deeply Tory newspaper, in 1813.

References

External links
 Profile and works of John Taylor, Esq
 Footnote on John Taylor, Esq., in a paper by Jan Seewald, Theatrical Sculpture, p. 102

1757 births
1832 deaths
English writers
English male writers